The canton of Joinville is an administrative division of the Haute-Marne department, northeastern France. Its borders were modified at the French canton reorganisation which came into effect in March 2015. Its seat is in Joinville.

It consists of the following communes:
 
Ambonville
Arnancourt
Autigny-le-Grand
Autigny-le-Petit
Baudrecourt
Beurville
Blécourt
Blumeray
Bouzancourt
Brachay
Charmes-en-l'Angle
Charmes-la-Grande
Chatonrupt-Sommermont
Cirey-sur-Blaise
Courcelles-sur-Blaise
Dommartin-le-Saint-Père
Donjeux
Doulevant-le-Château
Ferrière-et-Lafolie
Flammerécourt
Fronville
Gudmont-Villiers
Guindrecourt-aux-Ormes
Joinville
Leschères-sur-le-Blaiseron
Mathons
Mertrud
Mussey-sur-Marne
Nomécourt
Nully
Rouvroy-sur-Marne
Rupt
Saint-Urbain-Maconcourt
Suzannecourt
Thonnance-lès-Joinville
Trémilly
Vaux-sur-Saint-Urbain
Vecqueville

References

Cantons of Haute-Marne